Jan Christian Johansen (born 9 January 1966) is a Swedish singer, best known for representing Sweden in the Eurovision Song Contest 1995.

Life and career
Jan Johansen represented Sweden at the 1995 Eurovision Song Contest with "Se på mig" and finished third with 100 points. The song stayed at the top of Svensktoppen for fifteen weeks, charting for thirty weeks in total. His father is the Norwegian jazz musician Egil Johansen and his mother is the Norwegian-born 50s jazz singer Ellen Böbak.

Johansen has participated in Melodifestivalen four times since "Se på mig" - fourth place in 2001 with "Ingenmansland", seventh place in 2002 with "Sista andetaget" and second place in Melodifestivalen 2003 with "Let Your Spirit Fly", a duet with Pernilla Wahlgren. After the second place in 2003 with "Let your spirit fly" followed 17 years were Jan Johansen did not participate in the Melodifestivalen. He has continued to release music and toured in Sweden and Scandinavia. In February 2020, Johansen was asked to perform the song "Se på mig" as a mid time act in one of the competitions in the Melodifestivalen in Linköping.
While in Linköping Johansen was asked by the production team to perform the song "Miraklernas Tid" (Time for miracles) by Thomas G:son, as a replacement for the artist Thorsten Flinck who had to leave the competition due to legal reasons.
After 24 hours to think it over  Johansen agreed to perform the song, save the song from being scratched from the competition with less than a week to rehearse until the competition in Gothenburg. During that week Johansen attended interviews, was booked for 4 concerts which of he had to cancel 2 to have more time to rehearse. Johansen did some minor changes to the staging of the number, to try to make it suit his artistry better. This song was not written for Johansen and the song was only performed once and did not make it to the final. Johansen decided not to record the song.

In Marsh 2013 Johansen published his autobiography entitled Med nya ögon (Through Different Eyes) which he co-authored with journalist Colette van Luik. After being sober from alcohol since 2008 Johansen had gone through therapy and started to process aspects of his life. This resulted in this book in which he tells in a self-evident way his life story as a musician and performer. From childhood to the big breakthrough in 1995. Describes marriage, becoming dad, self-esteem, and the backside of celebrity.

Discography

Albums

Only released in Norway and Finland

Singles 

Chart positions are taken from Sverigetopplistan, Svensktoppen, Trackslistan, VG-lista and Hit40

References

External links 

Official website

1966 births
Living people
Swedish male singers
Swedish people of Norwegian descent
Melodifestivalen winners
Eurovision Song Contest entrants for Sweden
Eurovision Song Contest entrants of 1995
Melodifestivalen contestants of 2020
Melodifestivalen contestants of 2003
Melodifestivalen contestants of 2002
Melodifestivalen contestants of 2001
Melodifestivalen contestants of 1995